The Western Carolina Catamounts football team has had 8 players drafted into the National Football League. 3 former Western Carolina players have been selected to play in a Pro Bowl and one has been named an all-Pro selection.

Selections

References

Western Carolina

Western Carolina Catamounts NFL Draft